Sheran Yeini (sometimes Sherran or Shiran, ; born 8 December 1986) is an Israeli professional footballer who captains the Israeli Premier League club Maccabi Tel Aviv, and a retired player and captain of the Israel national team. Throughout his career he has played several defensive positions including defensive midfielder, centre-back, and both full-back positions.

Early and personal life
Yeini was born in Tel Aviv, Israel, to a family of Ashkenazi Jewish (Russian-Jewish and Polish-Jewish) descent. His late Israeli-born father Lior Yeini (1936–2021) was a prominent singer and actor in Israel during the 1960s and 1970s. His maternal great-aunt is Israeli singer Naomi Polani, granddaughter of Zionist pioneer Dr. Chaim Chissin.

He also holds a Polish passport, on account of his Ashkenazi Jewish (Polish-Jewish) ancestry, which eases the move to certain European football leagues.

He married his Israeli girlfriend Shelly ( Aviv) on 23 May 2015, a PhD in law; and they have a daughter and a son.

Club career
Sheran Yeini began his football career with Maccabi Tel Aviv's youth ranks.

Maccabi Tel Aviv 
He made his professional debut with the senior squad of Maccabi Tel Aviv under the guidance of coach Nir Klinger for an Israeli Premier League match against Hapoel Be'er Sheva in 2004–05.

In the 2006–07 season, Yeini served on the opening squad for 10 matches due to injuries faced by the team's star midfielder at the time: Avi Nimni. Yeini showed great ability, which lead then Israel national under-21 team coach Guy Levi to summon him up for the UEFA European Under-21 Championship campaign, where Yeini appeared in 10 games.

In 2012–13, Yeini was named team captain. For the most part, he played at right-back and has become one of the most influential players on a team that won the Israeli Premier League championship after a ten-year drought. On 26 June 2013, Sheran Yeni's contract was extended for an additional four years.

In the 2013–14 season, Yeini continued to take a significant role with the team while participating in 29 league games and 42 official games in total, en route to winning a second consecutive state championship. During that season, Yeini reached his 200th Israeli Premier League game with the senior squad, while also becoming Maccabi Tel Aviv's record holder for most caps played in European Competition. By the end of the 2014–15 season, Yeini was part of the Maccabi Tel Aviv team that has won a third straight Israeli Premier League championship along with Israel State Cup as well as the Toto Cup (Ligat Ha'Al).

Vitesse 
In the summer of 2015, Yeini has been transferred to Dutch Premier League side Vitesse.

Return to Maccabi Tel Aviv 
On 27 January 2017, Yeini returned to his previous Israeli Premier League club Maccabi Tel Aviv, signing a three-and-a-half-year contract.

International career
Yeini was a U-21 youth international for Israel from 2007 to 2008.

He made his first international appearance for the senior Israel national team on 22 March 2013, in a FIFA World Cup 2014 qualifier match against Portugal, during which he successfully guarded forward Cristiano Ronaldo and was elected MVP of the match, that ended in a 3–3 draw (4–4 in aggregation).

As the captain of the senior national team, Yeini declared his retirement from the Israeli squad in a press conference during his last match with it, on 18 November 2020.

Honours
Maccabi Tel Aviv
 Israeli Premier League: 2012–13, 2013–14, 2014–15, 2018–19, 2019–20
 Israel State Cup: 2004–05, 2014–15 
 Israel Toto Cup (Ligat Ha'Al): 2008–09, 2014–15, 2017–18, 2018–19, 2020–21
 Israel Super Cup: 2019, 2020

See also 
 List of Jewish footballers
 List of Jews in sports
 List of Israelis

References

External links
UEFA profile

1986 births
Living people
Israeli  Jews
Israeli Ashkenazi Jews
Israeli footballers
Jewish footballers
Association football midfielders
Association football defenders
Association football central defenders
Association football fullbacks
Israeli Premier League players
Eredivisie players
Maccabi Tel Aviv F.C. players
SBV Vitesse players
Israel youth international footballers
Israel under-21 international footballers
Israel international footballers
Israeli expatriate footballers
Expatriate footballers in the Netherlands
Israeli expatriate sportspeople in the Netherlands
Israeli people of Russian-Jewish descent
Israeli people of Polish-Jewish descent
Footballers from Tel Aviv